East Line may refer to:

Railways
East Line (Denmark), a local railway eastern Zealand, Denmark
East line (Macau LRT), a planned rapid transit line in Macau, China
East Line (MARTA), a rapid transit line in Atlanta, Georgia, United States, now part of the Blue Line
East Rail line, a rapid transit line in Hong Kong, China
A Line (RTD), a commuter rail line in Denver, Colorado, United States, called the East Rail Line during planning and construction

Other
East Line Group, an airport infrastructure business in Russia

See also
East Link (disambiguation)
East West Line (disambiguation)
Eastern Line (disambiguation)